The 1994 United States House of Representatives elections in West Virginia were held on November 8, 1994 to determine who will represent the state of West Virginia in the United States House of Representatives. West Virginia has three seats in the House, apportioned according to the 1990 United States Census. Representatives are elected for two-year terms.

Overview

District 1 
 

Incumbent Democrat Alan Mollohan defeated Republican Sally Rossy Riley. This district covers the northern part of the state.

District 2 
 

Incumbent Democrat Bob Wise defeated Republican Samuel A. Cravotta. This district covers the central part of the state.

District 3 
 

Incumbent Democrat Nick Rahall defeated Republican Ben Waldman. This district covers the southern part of the state.

References 

1994 West Virginia elections
West Virginia
1994